Howard Aiken Ijams (April 10, 1873 – March 7, 1923) was a physician. He was the first quarterback in the history of the Tennessee Volunteers football team. He played on the team from the 1891 season to the 1893 season.

References

Tennessee Volunteers football players
American football quarterbacks
Physicians from Tennessee
Players of American football from Tennessee
1873 births
1923 deaths
People from Knoxville, Tennessee